Augusta of Cambridge (19 July 1822 – 5 December 1916) was a member of the British royal family, a granddaughter of George III. She married into the Grand Ducal House of Mecklenburg-Strelitz and became the Grand Duchess of Mecklenburg-Strelitz.

Early life
Augusta was born Princess Augusta of Cambridge on 19 July 1822 at the Palace of Montbrillant, Hanover. Her father was Prince Adolphus, Duke of Cambridge, the seventh son of George III and Charlotte of Mecklenburg-Strelitz. Her mother was Princess Augusta of Hesse-Kassel. As a male line granddaughter of a British monarch, she was titled a British princess with the style of Royal Highness. The young princess was baptized at the same palace on 16 August 1822, by Rev Edward Curtis Kemp (Chaplain to the British Ambassador to the Court of Berlin, The Rt. Hon. Sir George Rose).
Three of her godparents were present at the baptism:
Princess Frederick of Hesse-Kassel (her maternal grandmother)
Princess Luise Henriette of Nassau-Usingen (her maternal great-aunt)
Princess Louise, Countess von der Decken (her maternal aunt)
The rest were not present, possibly being represented by proxies:
The Duke of York and Albany (her paternal uncle)
all of her five living paternal aunts (by blood)
The Queen Dowager of Württemberg
The Princess Augusta Sophia
The Landgravine of Hesse-Homburg
The Duchess of Gloucester and Edinburgh
The Princess Sophia
The Electress of Hesse (wife of Wilhelm II, her mother's cousin)
The Grand Duchess of Mecklenburg-Strelitz (her maternal aunt)
Princess Charles of Hesse-Kassel (wife of her maternal uncle)

The Princess spent her earlier years in Hanover, where her father was the viceroy on behalf of his brother, George IV.

Princess Augusta had one brother, Prince George, later 2nd Duke of Cambridge; and one sister, Princess Mary Adelaide, later Duchess of Teck. As such, Princess Augusta was an aunt to Mary of Teck, later  consort of George V.  Additionally, Princess Augusta was a first cousin through her father to Queen Victoria and through her mother to Princess Louise of Hesse-Kassel, the wife of King Christian IX of Denmark.

With her mother, she was part of the royal party at the 1838 coronation of Queen Victoria.

Marriage
On 28 June 1843, Princess Augusta married her first cousin, Frederick William of Mecklenburg-Strelitz, at Buckingham Palace, London. (The two were also second cousins on their fathers' side.) Upon marriage, Augusta became the Hereditary Grand Duchess of Mecklenburg-Strelitz and, on 6 September 1860, the Grand Duchess of Mecklenburg-Strelitz following the death of her father-in-law.

The marriage of the Grand Duke and Grand Duchess produced two children:
 Duke Frederick William of Mecklenburg-Strelitz (born and died in London, 13 January 1845)
 Duke Adolphus Frederick of Mecklenburg-Strelitz (22 July 1848 – 11 June 1914); succeeded his father as Adolphus Frederick V in May 1904.

Later life
Although she spent most of her adult life in Germany, the Grand Duchess Augusta retained close personal ties to the British Royal Family. She frequently visited her mother, the Duchess of Cambridge, at her Kensington Palace apartments.

After her mother's death in 1889, the Grand Duchess acquired a house—thereafter known as Mecklenburg House—at 16 Buckingham Gate, London, where she spent a portion of the year until advanced old age made it impossible for her to travel abroad.

In making preparations for the coronation of King Edward VII and Queen Alexandra in 1901, the Duke of Norfolk consulted her on matters of etiquette and attire. This was due to her presence at the coronation of King William IV and Queen Adelaide seventy-one years earlier. She was nine years old at the time and kissed the Queen's hand. She was also able to provide details of the coronation of Queen Victoria.

The Grand Duchess of Mecklenburg-Strelitz was particularly close to her niece, the future Queen Mary.  However, old age prevented her from attending the coronation of King George V and Queen Mary on 22 June 1911.

Following the outbreak of World War I, the British Government suspended the annuity she had been receiving as a member of the British Royal Family under the Annuity, Duchess of Mecklenburgh Strelitz Act 1843. During the war, the Swedish Embassy passed letters from the Queen to her aunt, who still lived in Germany.

As an elderly lady, she was known for being cantankerous. She was also known as being quite shrewd and intelligent.  In his book, Queen Mary (London, 1959), the Queen's official biography, James Pope-Hennessy reports that the Queen's aunt Augusta was not fond of the new science of photography, fearing it would intrude deeply into the private lives of Royal personages; at pp. 101–105 he offers a masterly sketch of this formidable lady.

The Dowager Grand Duchess of Mecklenburg-Strelitz died on 5 December 1916 in Neustrelitz and was buried in Mirow. As the longest-lived grandchild of George III, she was the last link to the British branch of the House of Hanover.

At the time of her death, she was 94 years, 4 months and 16 days old, making her the longest-lived British princess by blood, until Princess Alice, Countess of Athlone, a male-line granddaughter of Queen Victoria, surpassed her in 1977. Her will was sealed and in 1920 her estate was valued at £57,282 (or £1.7 million in 2022 when adjusted for inflation).

Titles, styles and honours

Titles and styles
19 July 1822 – 28 June 1843: Her Royal Highness Princess Augusta of Cambridge
28 June 1843 – 6 September 1860: Her Royal Highness The Hereditary Grand Duchess of Mecklenburg-Strelitz
6 September 1860 – 30 May 1904: Her Royal Highness The Grand Duchess of Mecklenburg-Strelitz
30 May 1904 – 5 December 1916: Her Royal Highness The Dowager Grand Duchess of Mecklenburg-Strelitz

Honours
 :
 Royal Family Order of George IV
 Companion of the Imperial Order of the Crown of India, 1878
 :
 Dame of the Order of Louise, 1st Division
 Ladies Merit Cross
  Hesse and by Rhine: Dame of the Grand Ducal Hessian Order of the Golden Lion, 1 July 1889
 : Dame Grand Cross of the Imperial Order of Saint Catherine

Ancestors

References

External links
Princess Augusta of Cambridge | House of Mecklenburg-Strelitz

1822 births
1916 deaths
Nobility from Hanover
House of Hanover
British princesses
Hanoverian princesses
Daughters of British dukes
Duchesses of Mecklenburg-Strelitz
Grand Duchesses of Mecklenburg-Strelitz
Hereditary Grand Duchesses of Mecklenburg-Strelitz
Companions of the Order of the Crown of India